Nazar Ihorovych Voloshyn (born 17 June 2003) is a Ukrainian professional footballer who plays as a right winger for Dynamo Kyiv.

Career

Early years
Born in Kremenchuk, Voloshyn began his career in the neighbouring Metalist Kharkiv and then continued in the Dynamo Kyiv academy.

Dynamo Kyiv
He played in the Ukrainian Premier League Reserves and never made his debut for the senior Dynamo Kyiv squad.

Loan to Kryvbas Kryvyi Rih
In July 2022 Voloshyn signed a one-year loan contract with the newly promoted Ukrainian Premier League side Kryvbas Kryvyi Rih and made his league debut in the losing away match against Kolos Kovalivka on 23 August.

References

External links
 
 

2003 births
Living people
People from Kremenchuk
Ukrainian footballers
Ukraine youth international footballers
Association football forwards
FC Dynamo Kyiv players
FC Kryvbas Kryvyi Rih players
Ukrainian Premier League players
Sportspeople from Poltava Oblast